Avangard can mean:

 Avangard (hypersonic glide vehicle) a Russian weapon system
 Avangard, the R&D codename for the RS-26 Rubezh, a Russian ICBM
 Avangard Budy a bandy club from the Ukraine
 Avangard Omsk an ice hockey team in Omsk, Russia
 Avangard Stadium a football stadium in Kazakhstan
 FC Avangard the football team that played there from 2005 to 2008
 Avangard, Tajikistan a city in Tajikistan
 Avangard-Yugra Kogalym an ice hockey team from Kogalym, Russia
 FC Avangard Kursk a football team in Kursk, Russia
 Avangard (Saint Petersburg company), a company based in Saint Petersburg, Russia
 Moscow Machine Building Plant "Avangard"